Haiyang Nuclear Power Plant is a nuclear power plant in Haiyang, Shandong province, China. It is the second site to house AP1000 units, after the Sanmen Nuclear Power Station.

History
Groundbreaking happened one month ahead of schedule on July 30, 2008.  Construction of the first unit began in September 2009.  Civil construction of Unit 1 was completed 29 March 2013. Fuel loading at Haiyang 1 began on June 22, 2018. First grid connection was on 17 August 2018.
Unit 1 began commercial operation on 22 October 2018.

Construction of unit 2 started in June 2010, at that time the fourth Chinese AP1000 project together with the two units of the Sanmen NPP. Commercial operation began in January 2019, after having completed a full-power test run for a week (168 hours). Both units will provide together about 20 TWh of electricity to the grid of Shandong province.

On July 7, 2022, construction began on unit 3 after authorization had been granted.

Reactor data

District Heating 
In September 2020, the plant's owner and a thermal company instigated a plan to heat all of Haiyang city via heat exchange. Two months later, 700,000 square meters of housing had been heated and the project was en route for completion in its entirety in 2021. The switch to clean energy is expected to eliminate more than 180,000 tonnes of fossil fuel emissions each year, and the corresponding reduction in air pollution is anticipated to save about 600 lives annually. By November 2022, the plant used 345 MW-thermal effect to heat 200,000 homes, replacing 12 coal heating plants.

See also

Nuclear power in China

References

Nuclear power stations in China
Power stations in Shandong
Nuclear power stations using AP1000 reactors
2018 establishments in China
Nuclear power stations with reactors under construction
Nuclear power stations with proposed reactors
Haiyang